Malachai may refer to:

Name
 variant spelling of the name of the Hebrew prophet Malachi 
 Malachai Nicolle, author of Axe Cop
 Malachai Boardmann, character in Stephen King's "Children of the Corn", played by Courtney Gains in the film
 Malachai Parker, character in The Vampire Diaries, played by Chris Wood in the series
 Malachai, Thaumaturge Laureate, character in the game Path of Exile

Music
Malachai (band)
Malachai (album)

Other
A demon in the Chronicles of Nick